Eurex Airlines, also known as Eurex Cargo, was a cargo airline from Georgia with its headquarters in Istanbul, Turkey, that offered ad hoc flights out of Tbilisi International Airport. It was founded in 2009 and (in January 2011) operated only one freighter aircraft, a 26 years old Boeing 747-200F. In February 2011, the aircraft left the fleet and the company was shut down.

References

Defunct airlines of Georgia (country)
Defunct airlines of Turkey
Airlines established in 2009
Airlines disestablished in 2011
2009 establishments in Georgia (country)
2011 disestablishments in Georgia (country)